Moreton House may refer to:

 Moreton House, Bideford
 Moreton House, Hampstead

See also
 Moreton Hall (disambiguation)
 Morton House (disambiguation)
 Moretons House, at Harrow School